House of Bond is an Australian two-part drama mini-series about the life of business tycoon Alan Bond which was produced in 2016 and aired on the Nine Network on 24 and 25 April 2017.

Synopsis
House of Bond is a dramatised account of the life of Alan Bond, from the 1960s to the 2000s.
Part One details Bond's prominence as a property investor and entrepreneur finishing with his greatest triumph as head of the syndicate that won the 1983 America's Cup. Part Two sees him expand on a global scale before his hubris saw his empire spectacularly falling down, becoming embroiled in a number of WA Inc scandals including the bailout of the Rothwells Bank and the stripping of Bell Resources.

Cast
Ben Mingay as Alan Bond
Rachael Taylor as Diana Bliss
Adrienne Pickering as Eileen Bond
Sam Neill as Roland "Tiny" Rowland
Anne Louise Lambert
Gyton Grantley
Samantha Jade as Tracey Tyler
Anne Looby
John Howard
Johnny Ruffo
Roy Billing
Paul Gleeson
Jack Campbell as John Bertrand
Vanessa Moltzen
Airlee Dodds as Susanne Bond
Bill Young as Frank Bond
John McNeill as Sir Frank Packer

Reception
The series was criticised as "appalling" by Alan Bond's widow Eileen Bond. His family released a statement, claiming it was "inaccurate and sensationalised". Diana Bliss's brother Graeme, meanwhile appreciated Rachael Taylor's sympathetic portrayal of his sister believing she would be pleased with the series.

The series was generally well received. The Age and TV Week named the series 'Pick of the Week'. TV Week gave it 5/5 saying 'Adrienne Pickering is wonderful as the lively Eileen'. The Age called it 'luxurious and ambitious'. News.com.au called 'a 'riveting' yarn.' Debi Enker in The Sydney Morning Herald said it 'has the quality of a Shakespearean tragedy...' and 'captures the flash-and-dazzle of the era and offers some insight into a singular and spectacular rise and fall.' The Daily Telegraph called House of Bond a "flop",  and the series received a 2.5 star rating from TV Tonight

Viewership
The mini-series averaged 657,000 across the five mainland capital cities on its final night winning its timeslot and increasing its ratings on the previous night.

DVD release
The series was released on DVD by Universal Home Video on May 11, 2017.

See also
 Power Games: The Packer-Murdoch War

References

Nine Network original programming
Australian drama television series
2017 Australian television series debuts